Star Chart is a Canadian music television series which aired on CBC Television in 1980.

Premise
This Vancouver-produced series featured songs that were listed on the music charts of Canadian Recording Industry Association. Terry David Mulligan hosted this show, which was similar to Mulligan's radio show The Great Canadian Gold Rush.

Scheduling
This half-hour series was broadcast Saturdays at 7:00 p.m. (Eastern) from 3 May to 6 September 1980.

References

External links
 
 

CBC Television original programming
1980 Canadian television series debuts
1980 Canadian television series endings
1980s Canadian music television series